Manakkody is a village in Thrissur district in the state of Kerala, India. It is famous for the scenic beauty of paddy fields extending from Manakody to Pullu.

Demographics
 India census, Manakkody had a population of 5527 with 2717 males and 2810 females.

References

Villages in Thrissur district